Stephen 'Steve' McDonald (born 2 October 1974) is a former English cricketer.  McDonald was a right-handed batsman who bowled right-arm off break.  He was born at Birmingham, Warwickshire.

McDonald represented the Warwickshire Cricket Board in List A cricket.  His debut List A match came against  Berkshire in the 1999 NatWest Trophy.  From 1999 to 2001, he represented the Board in 4 matches, the last of which came against Lancashire in the 2001 Cheltenham & Gloucester Trophy.  In his 5 List A matches, he scored 51 runs at a batting average of 12.75, with a high score of 25.

References

External links
Steve McDonald at Cricinfo

1974 births
Living people
Cricketers from Birmingham, West Midlands
English cricketers
Warwickshire Cricket Board cricketers
English cricketers of 1969 to 2000
English cricketers of the 21st century